The women's 4×100 metre medley relay took place on 20–21 August at the Olympic Aquatic Centre of the Athens Olympic Sports Complex in Athens, Greece.

The Australians reinforced their claim to become the strongest women's team in the world with a convincing triumph over their American rivals in the event. Giaan Rooney, Leisel Jones, Petria Thomas, and Jodie Henry broke almost a full second off the world record set by Team USA in 2000, stopping the clock at 3:57.32. At the start of the race, the U.S. team got off to a flying start in the backstroke, until the Australians reeled them in on the butterfly leg. Thomas blasted a remarkable split of 56.67, the fastest of all-time in Olympic history, to overhaul Jenny Thompson of the U.S. team, and eventually move the Aussies in front of the race. The anchor freestyle leg left Henry to go up against Kara Lynn Joyce, and the Australians looked unbeatable with Henry, touching the wall first in 52.97, the second-fastest split of all-time.

Meanwhile, the U.S. team of Thompson, Joyce, Natalie Coughlin, and Amanda Beard settled only for the silver in 3:59.12, almost two seconds behind the Aussies. The Germans maintained their pace to earn a bronze, and finished in a European record of 4:00.72.

Competing in her fourth Olympics for Team USA, Thompson became the most decorated American athlete in history with her twelfth career medal, including 10 from the relays.

Records
Prior to this competition, the existing world and Olympic records were as follows.

The following new world and Olympic records were set during this competition.

Results

Heats

Final

References

External links
Official Olympic Report

W
2004 in women's swimming
Women's events at the 2004 Summer Olympics